ASIS may refer to:

 Alam Shah Science School, a high performance-fully residential school in Malaysia
 Australian Secret Intelligence Service
 Ada Semantic Interface Specification (ISO/IEC 15291)
 American Society for Information Science and Technology (ASIS&T), sometimes known as the American Society for Information Science (ASIS)
 ASIS International, a professional organization focused on the security industry, formerly American Society for Industrial Security
 Anterior superior iliac spine, a bony projection of iliac bone
 Avans School of International Studies, the business studies faculty of Avans University of Applied Sciences
Automatic Surface Inspection Systems, see Machine vision
A Study in Scarlet, an 1887 mystery novel by Sir Arthur Conan Doyle featuring Sherlock Holmes.
Anterior superior iliac spine, a bony projection of the ilium